The 2015 European Figure Skating Championships were held 26 January – 1 February 2015 in Stockholm, Sweden. Medals were awarded in the disciplines of men's singles, ladies' singles, pairs, and ice dancing.

Overview 
The event was the first figure skating ISU Championship to be held in Stockholm since 1947, when the city hosted the World Championships. It last hosted the European Championships in 1912. Ericsson Globe served as the competition arena and Annexet as the training rink. In June 2014, Annexet was iced over for the first time since 1989.

Qualification
Skaters were eligible for the event if they represented a European member nation of the International Skating Union and had reached the age of 15 before 1 July 2014 in their place of birth. The corresponding competition for non-European skaters is the 2015 Four Continents Championships. National associations selected their entries according to their own criteria, but the ISU mandated that their selections must achieve a minimum technical elements score (TES) at an international event prior to the European Championships.

Minimum TES

Number of entries per discipline
Based on the results of the 2014 European Championships, the ISU allowed each country one to three entries per discipline.

Entries
Countries began announcing their entries in early December 2014 and the ISU published a complete list of competitors on 11 January 2015:

Results

Men

Ladies

Pairs

Ice dancing

Medals summary

Medals by country 
Table of medals for overall placement:

Table of small medals for placement in the short segment:

Table of small medals for placement in the free segment:

Medalists 
Medals for overall placement

Small medals for placement in the short segment

Small medals for placement in the free segment

References

External links 
 
 2015 Europeans at the International Skating Union

European Figure Skating Championships
European
European Figure Skating Championships
European Figure Skating Championships
European Figure Skating Championships
2010s in Stockholm
February 2015 sports events in Europe
January 2015 sports events in Europe